Pandit Ishwar Dayal Swami (11 August 1929 – 15 December 2019) was an Indian politician and former IAS officer, who served as Union Minister of State for Home Affairs in the Third Vajpayee Ministry. He also took part in the freedom movement as student leader in 1946–47. He was Scholarship holder from class 4th to 10th which was forfeited by the then British Government for having led a procession of students against the famous Red Fort trials of Shahnawaz, Dhillon and Sehgal of INA. He was elected to Lok Sabha from Karnal in Haryana. He died on 15 December 2019 at Metro Hospital, Faridabad.

References

External links 
https://web.archive.org/web/20060519035132/http://in.news.yahoo.com/040429/43/2ctki.html
ISI must be declared terror outfit: I D Swami

Bharatiya Janata Party politicians from Haryana
1929 births
2019 deaths
India MPs 1996–1997
Lok Sabha members from Haryana
India MPs 1999–2004
People from Karnal district